Giovanni Renica (1808 – 1884) was an Italian painter, active in a Romantic style.

He was born in Montirone in the province of Brescia, and died in Brescia. He was a pupil of Giovanni Migliara. He became a teacher at the Brera Academy. He made a trip to the Orient, which gave him inspiration. He left his notes to the Atheneum of Brescia. Among his pupils was Gaetano Fasanotti.

Sources

External links

1808 births
1884 deaths
19th-century Italian painters
Italian male painters
Painters from Brescia
Academic staff of Brera Academy
Orientalist painters
19th-century Italian male artists